Rot op met je milieu (English: Get Lost With Your Environment) is a 2016 Dutch television series by the Evangelische Omroep, presented by Dennis van der Geest.

Setting and purpose 
Six people confront each other's hugely differing opinions and behaviours towards environmental issues, whilst spending two weeks together in a small house in IJmuiden. Everything that goes into the house, such as waste and furniture, may not be removed from it during that fortnight, and presenter Dennis delivers them their combined CO2 emissions each morning in the symbolic shape of red balloons. The participants also go on educative trips to see environmental problems in practice, and how these may be dealt with and perhaps resolved. They must participate in these activities, unless they find this way too difficult to handle.

Participants

Reception 
During a preview, GroenLinks leader Jesse Klaver said: 'I'm really looking forward to this series. I think this is the best way to show how your personal behaviour has an effect on such a large phenomenon as the environment.'

Trouw reviewer Renate van der Bas wrote that viewers of the programme 'learn a lot', and characterised it as 'a fitting call' for more sustainability. However, the title chosen for the show, Rot op met je milieu, was 'not very subtle', and the selection of participants 'rather over the top'. Hans Beerekamp of NRC Handelsblad opined that the show was 'somewhat less predictable' than your average reality show, 'but most of it is still the result of editorial manipulation'. Beerekamp mostly criticised the fact that the two participants Donny and Roxanne, who he said represented the 'super-spoilt generation', didn't seem to realise how they contributed to the current environmental problems through their own behaviour.

See also 
Rot op met je religie

References

External links 
Official website
All episodes of Rot op met je milieu at NPO.nl

Netherlands Public Broadcasting
2010s Dutch television series
Dutch reality television series
Environmentalism in the Netherlands
Environmental education
Climate change denial
NPO 2 original programming